Janga or Jangi-Tau or Dzhangi-Tau  (Džangi-Tau) is a summit in the central part of the Greater Caucasus Mountain Range. Mountain has three peaks - the main peak Jangi-Tau with elevation above sea level , West Peak with elevation  and East Peak with elevation    Mountain lies on the border of Svaneti (Georgia) and Kabardino-Balkaria (Russia).  The slopes of the mountain are heavily glaciated. They are most famous for the dormant volcanoes that are hidden under the ice caps.

History 
On September 12, 1888, English climber John Garford Cockin with Swiss guides Ulrich Almer and Christian Roth, were the first to climb East Janga, who had climbed the main ridge a few days earlier, and later - Ushba and Dykh-Tau. The most difficult, 5 B category (Russian Grading) route (south-western wall) was first traced by Georgian mountaineers (Grisha Gulbani - group leader Giorgi Berdzenishvili, Jokia Gugava, Sozar Gugava, Ilo Kavlashvili, Suliko Khabeishvili). The first ascent to the main Janga also belongs to foreign climbers.  Jangha The Olympians Club of Georgia 

On July 23, 1935, they climbed the peak of the north-eastern ridge (5 A category, Russian Grading ) to R. Schwarzgruber (group leader) v. Marini, f. Peringer et al. Thaler. Only one route passes through the Khalde Glacier. In 1965, Givi Kartvelishvili (group leader), Tamaz Bakanidze, Nugzar Bakradze, Besik Bakradze, Tengiz Berishvili and Dimitri Sharashenidze reached the peak of the main wall through the south wall of the USSR championship program. West Janga is the most inaccessible among the peaks of the array. 

It cannot be taken from the north due to "frost and avalanche" danger. There are two routes from Khalde Glacier (1960 - Otar Khazaradze, 1964 - I. Reformatorski).

References 

Mountains of Georgia (country)
Mountains of Kabardino-Balkaria
Georgia (country)–Russia border
International mountains of Europe
Five-thousanders of the Caucasus